The Phoenix Bioscience Core (PBC), formerly the Phoenix Biomedical Campus, is a city-owned, 30-acre urban bioscience and medical education and research campus located in downtown Phoenix, Arizona. It comprises public and private academic, clinical and research organizations. It is the only site where you will find all 3 of Arizona’s public universities in one location conducting and collaborating in research.

Overview 
As the 5th largest city in the United States, Phoenix boasts institutes of excellence in precision medicine, genomics, molecular medicine, cancer research, healthcare analytics and others. Nowhere is this more concentrated than on the Phoenix Biomedical Campus. The city-owned Phoenix Biomedical Campus (PBC) is a 30-acre, urban medical and bioscience campus with more than 1.7 million square-feet of biomedical-related research, academic, and clinical facilities with plans for more than 6 million square-feet at build out. It was established in 2004 by an initiative between City of Phoenix, Arizona State University, University of Arizona, and Arizona Board of Regents to expand medical education and research in the Phoenix metropolitan area. It is part of a broader series of medical centers, hospitals and research institutes present in the Phoenix healthcare cluster.

Economic impact 

According to a report by Tripp Umbach, an economic consulting firm, Phoenix Biomedical Campus had a $1.3 billion economic impact in 2013. It is projected to have an economic impact of $3.1 billion in 2025.  The campus provided 9,377 jobs in 2013 and is expected to generate 22,132 jobs by 2025.

Future developments 
Wexford Science+Technology opened 850PBC, the 850 N 5th Street Innovation Center on the PBC in March 2021. www.850PBC.com This newest biomedical research center is anchored by expanded research of Arizona State University. The Center for Entrepreneurial Innovation (CEI) out of GateWay Community College expanded its entrepreneurial incubator services with the opening of a Validation Lab and LabForce, a unique workforce training to support certification-level training for lab technicians and other technical training required in a lab environment. 850PBC provides the opportunity for private-sector biomedical companies to co-locate and collaborate with leading researchers and institutions on the Phoenix Biomedical Campus. 

Additional new bio-innovation centers are planned for the Phoenix Biomedical Campus. There is almost 2 million square feet of facilities with planned build out at 6 million square feet.

Present institutions 
The following institutions all have a presences on the Campus:
 Ashion Analytics
 Arizona State University
 College of Health Solutions
 Center for Entrepreneurial Innovation (CEI) 
 Dignity Health
 University of Arizona Cancer Center at Dignity Health’s St. Joseph’s
Exact Sciences
International Genomics Consortium
 National Institute of Diabetes and Digestive and Kidney Diseases
 Northern Arizona University
 Athletic Training Program
 College of Health and Human Services
 Occupational Therapy Program
 Physical Therapy Program
 Physician’s Assistant Program
 OncoMyx Therapeutics
 Phoenix Union Bioscience High School
 University of Arizona
 Eller College of Management
 College of Medicine – Phoenix
 College of Pharmacy
 College of Public Health
 College of Nursing
 Telemedicine Program
 Translational Genomics Research Institute
 Wexford Science+Technology

References

External links 
 http://biomedicalphoenix.com/
 http://phoenixmed.arizona.edu/
 https://tgen.org/

Buildings and structures in Phoenix, Arizona